Fatuyeh castle is a historical castle located in Bastak County in Hormozgan Province, The longevity of this fortress dates back to the Pre-Islamic period.

References 

Castles in Iran